The Série 1800 was a class of 10 diesel-electric locomotives built for the Portuguese Railways (CP) in 1968. Designed and engineered by English Electric, they were closely modelled on the British Rail Class 50 locomotives but built for CP's  and larger loading gauge than possible in Great Britain.

Like the British Rail Class 50s, they were equipped with an English Electric 16 CSVT engine and produced 2700 hp. Unlike the Class 50 locomotives, which made extensive use of electronic control, the Portuguese locomotives were equipped with conventional control gear. The main generator and the traction motors were identical to those used on the BR Type 3 and Deltic locomotives. The Série 1800 locomotives were built to be closely compatible with the smaller CP Série 1400 (themselves based on the British Rail Class 20) and also to use as many common components as possible.

By mid-1969, the class had logged more than 4 million kilometres in regular use and had proven their worth by hauling heavier and faster trains than other locomotive classes for CP. 

Initially they were used on the express services on the main line between Barreiro (near Lisbon) and Faro. After the electrification of the main line the locomotives were relegated to Inter Regional services in the Algarve. They were also used on the steeply-graded Beira Alta line, but were displaced by the more powerful Série 1960 locomotives in the late 1970s.

Apart from one which suffered serious accident damage, the Série 1800s were all withdrawn in 2001.

A single example is now part of the CP Railway Museum collection and has been repainted into the original blue livery. All others have been or are being scrapped (as of late 2012/early 2013).

References

Further reading

External links

Photographs of CP Série 1800 locomotives on the Flickr website

Railway locomotives introduced in 1968
English Electric locomotives
5 ft 6 in gauge locomotives
Diesel-electric locomotives of Portugal